Ming-yang Yang (born 11 July 1995) is a Swiss professional footballer who plays as a midfielder for Nantong Zhiyun.

Early life 
Yang was born in Basel, Switzerland to father Yang Zhihong, a professor of physiology at Fribourg University. His father originates from Wuhan, China and emigrated to Switzerland after he received a medical doctor's degree from Basel University in the 1990s. Yang began his football career with FC Fribourg youth team in 2001. He transferred to Neuchâtel Xamax in 2011 and moved to Lausanne-Sport in 2012.

Club career 
Yang was promoted to Lausanne-Sport's first team squad in the summer of 2013. On 14 July 2013, he made his senior debut in a 2–0 away defeat against FC Luzern.

After a short spell with FC Winterthur, on 31 August 2017, Yang joined English Championship club Wolverhampton Wanderers on a three-year deal for an undisclosed fee.

On 26 February 2021, Yang joined second tier Chinese football club Nantong Zhiyun. He would go on to make his debut in a league game on 25 April 2021 against Nanjing City in a 1-1 draw. This would be followed by his first goals for the club in a league game on 21 May 2021 against Nanjing City in a 3-1 victory. He would go on to establish himself within the team and helped the club gain promotion to the top tier at the end of the 2022 China League One season.

Career statistics 
Statistics accurate as of match played 31 December 2022.

References

External links

1995 births
Living people
Footballers from Basel
Swiss men's footballers
Swiss sportspeople of Chinese descent
Association football midfielders
FC Lausanne-Sport players
Swiss Super League players
Wolverhampton Wanderers F.C. players
FC Jumilla players
Swiss expatriate footballers
Swiss expatriate sportspeople in England
Expatriate footballers in England
Swiss expatriate sportspeople in Spain
Expatriate footballers in Spain
Segunda División B players
FC Fribourg players
Neuchâtel Xamax FCS players
FC Winterthur players
Grasshopper Club Zürich players
Switzerland youth international footballers